Prashant Awasthi may refer to:
 Prashant Awasthi (cricketer) (born 1990), Indian cricketer
 Prashant Awasthi (footballer) (born 1998), Nepalese footballer